In additive combinatorics and number theory, a subset A of an abelian group G is said to be sum-free if the sumset A + A is disjoint from A. In other words, A is sum-free if the equation  has no solution with .

For example, the set of odd numbers is a sum-free subset of the integers, and the set {N + 1, ..., 2N&hairsp;} forms a large sum-free subset of the set {1, ..., 2N&hairsp;}. Fermat's Last Theorem is the statement that, for a given integer n > 2, the set of all nonzero nth powers of the integers is a sum-free set.

Some basic questions that have been asked about sum-free sets are:

 How many sum-free subsets of {1, ..., N&hairsp;} are there, for an integer N?
 How many sum-free sets does an abelian group G contain? 
 What is the size of the largest sum-free set that an abelian group G contains?

A sum-free set is said to be maximal if it is not a proper subset of another sum-free set.

The function is subadditive, and by the Fekete subadditivity lemma,  exists. Erdős proved that , and conjectured that equality holds. This was proved by Eberhard, Green, and Manners.

See also 

 Erdős–Szemerédi theorem
 Sum-free sequence

References

Sumsets
Additive combinatorics